Air Flamenco is a commuter airline operated by Air Charter, Inc., based in Puerto Rico.

History
Air Flamenco traces its history to Flamenco Airways, which was founded in 1976 by Mr. Rubén Torres. The first aircraft used was the Piper Cherokee 6 with flights between the islands of Culebra and Vieques. Six months after initial operation they acquired their first twin engine Britten-Norman Islander with a capacity of 9 passengers. With this new aircraft their service expanded with more passenger routes and US postal service between the two islands of Vieques and Culebra and the main island of Puerto Rico. Within the following five years, the airline increased its fleet to 6 aircraft expanding its services and charter flights throughout the Caribbean Islands including US and British Virgin Islands.In 2009 the airline acquired 2 other Britten Norman Islanders for cargo flights.

The airline is based at 4 locations: Fernando Luis Ribas Dominicci Airport better known as the Isla Grande Airport, San Juan; José Aponte de la Torre Airport, Ceiba, Puerto Rico; Benjamín Rivera Noriega Airport, Culebra; and Antonio Rivera Rodríguez Airport, Vieques. Current destinations are cities in Puerto Rico, the Leeward Islands, and the Dominican Republic. Air Flamenco is currently the largest Britten-Norman Islander operator.

Air Flamenco flew under an air charter license until 2011. The FAA ordered the carrier to cease and desist exceeding the requirements of an air charter company as they were in actuality operating a commuter air service without license. They were fined $30,000. They have since obtained a license to fly as a commuter air service air carrier. The air carrier is a VFR-only approved carrier.

Fleet

8 Britten-Norman Islander
1 Britten-Norman Trislander
4 Short 360-300F

Besides being operated in passenger service, versions of all three of types are flown in all-cargo configuration by Flamenco Cargo, a division of Air Flamenco.

Accidents

Aircraft N902GD, Pilatus Britten-Norman BN-2A-27 Islander en route from Mayagüez to Isla Grande Airport, San Juan crashed. The airplane, transporting a bank's financial documents, departed Mayagüez at 18:30 on 29 September 2004. En route the airplane approached and penetrated a level 4-5 rain shower. Control was lost and the plane crashed into the sea. There was one fatality.
Aircraft N909GD, Pilatus Britten-Norman BN-2A-27 Islander en route from Ceiba, PR to the island of Culebra crashed on October 6, 2013 near Luis Peña while flying newspapers from the main island. No passengers were on board, however, the pilot did not survive.

References

External links

Air Charter Directory
Flight Stats Link
Aviation Safety Net

1976 establishments in Puerto Rico
Companies based in San Juan, Puerto Rico
Airlines of Puerto Rico
Puerto Rican brands
Airlines established in 1976